The Al-Amin Mosque is a mosque located at Telok Blangah, Singapore.

The mosque was built in the second phase of the Mosque Building and Mendaki Fund and completed in 1991.

It replaced a former mosque, Masjid Radin Mas, when it closed in 2001.

Transportation
The mosque is accessible from Telok Blangah MRT station.

See also
 Islam in Singapore
 List of mosques in Singapore

References

External links 
Majlis Ugama Islam Singapura, MUIS (Islamic Religious Council of Singapore)
List of Mosques in Singapore managed by MUIS : Masjid Al-Amin
GoogleMaps StreetView of Masjid Al-Amin

1991 establishments in Singapore
Al-Amin
Telok Blangah